Mary, Mary is a 1963 Technicolor romantic comedy film starring Debbie Reynolds and Barry Nelson as a divorced couple. It is based on the play of the same name by Jean Kerr.

Plot
When the Internal Revenue Service questions some of Bob McKellaway's (Barry Nelson) deductions, Bob cannot remember what $5,000 worth of checks were for. Without his knowledge, his new tax lawyer, Oscar Nelson (Hiram Sherman), asks Bob's ex-wife Mary (Debbie Reynolds) to stop by to see if she can help. Bob does not want to see her, nor have his fiancee Tiffany Richards (Diane McBain) meet her.

Cast
 Debbie Reynolds as Mary McKellaway
 Barry Nelson as Bob McKellaway
 Diane McBain as Tiffany Richards
 Hiram Sherman as Oscar Nelson
 Michael Rennie as Dirk Winston

References

External links
 
 
 
 

1963 films
1963 romantic comedy films
1960s English-language films
American films based on plays
American romantic comedy films
Comedy of remarriage films
Films directed by Mervyn LeRoy
Films set in New York City
Warner Bros. films
1960s American films